Karnana may refer to:

 Karnana, Pakistan, village in Pakistani Punjab
 Karnana, India, village in Indian Punjab